This page lists the city flags in Asia. It is a part of the Lists of city flags, which is split into continents due to its size.

Middle East

Azerbaijan

Bahrain

Iran

Iraq

Israel

Jordan

Kuwait

Lebanon

Oman

Palestine

Saudi Arabia

Syria

Turkey

United Arab Emirates

Historical

Central Asia

Kazakhstan

Historical

Kyrgyzstan

Tajikistan

Uzbekistan

East Asia

China

Historical

Japan

Mongolia

North Korea

South Korea

Historical

Taiwan

Historical

South Asia

Afghanistan

Bangladesh

India

Nepal

Pakistan

Sri Lanka

Southeast Asia

East Timor

Historical

Indonesia

Malaysia

Myanmar

Philippines

Singapore

Historical

Thailand

See also 
 List of city flags in Africa
 List of city flags in Europe
 List of city flags in North America
 List of city flags in Oceania
 List of city flags in South America

References

External links 
 Bangladesh: City flag of Dhaka by Flags of the World.
 China: Municipal flags of China by Flags of the World.
 Iran: Municipal flags of Iran by Flags of the World.
 Israel: Municipal flags of Israel by Flags of the World.
 Japan: Municipal flags of Japan by Flags of the World.
 Jordan: Municipal flags of Jordan by Flags of the World.
 Kazakhstan: City and county flags of Kazakhstan by Flags of the World.
 Lebanon: Municipal flags of Lebanon by Flags of the World.
 Mongolia: City flag of Ulaanbaatar by Flags of the World.
 Palestine: Municipal flags of Palestine by Flags of the World.
 Saudi Arabia: Municipal flags of Saudi Arabia by Flags of the World.
 Thailand: City flag of Bangkok by Flags of the World.